Stuart Fraser (born 1 August 1978) is a former footballer who played in the Football League for Exeter City and Stoke City.

Career
Fraser came through the youth ranks at his home town club Cheltenham Town before earning a move to Stoke for £100,000. However he only made one league appearance, which came against Walsall in the final game of the 1998–99 season when Fraser came on as a substitute for Carl Muggleton for the final 10 minutes. After a number of knee injuries he moved to Exeter City where he made a number of first team appearances but still struggled with knee problems. He has since played for Tiverton Town and Bath City and is now a sports coach in a primary school and goalkeeping coach for Exeter city centre of excellence.

Career statistics
Source:

References

External links
 

1978 births
Living people
English footballers
Cheltenham Town F.C. players
Stoke City F.C. players
Exeter City F.C. players
Tiverton Town F.C. players
Bath City F.C. players
English Football League players
Association football goalkeepers